The Japan women's national artistic gymnastics team represents Japan in FIG international competitions.

History
Japan has participated in the Olympic Games women's team competition 13 times and has won one team medal, a bronze in 1964.  Mai Murakami won Japan's first individual Olympic medal in women's artistic gymnastics: a bronze on floor exercise at the 2020 Olympic Games in Tokyo.  The team has also won two medals at the World Artistic Gymnastics Championships.

Current senior roster
Yuki Uchiyama
Aiko Sugihara
Marina Kawasaki
Sae Miyakawa
Mai Murakami
Natsumi Sasada
Asuka Teramoto
Mana Oguchi

Olympic Games team competition results
1928 — did not participate
1936 — did not participate
1948 — did not participate
1952 — did not participate
1956 — 6th place
1960 — 4th place
1964 —  bronze medal
1968 — 4th place
1972 — 7th place
1976 — 8th place
1980 — did not participate
1984 — 6th place
1988 — 12th place
1992 — did not participate
1996 — 12th place
2000 — did not participate
2004 — did not participate
2008 — 5th place
2012 — 8th place
2016 — 4th place
2020 — 5th place

Most decorated gymnasts
This list includes all Japanese female artistic gymnasts who have won a medal at the Olympic Games or the World Artistic Gymnastics Championships.

See also 
 List of Olympic female artistic gymnasts for Japan
 Japan at the World Artistic Gymnastics Championships
 Japan men's national gymnastics team

References

Gymnastics in Japan
National women's artistic gymnastics teams
Women's national sports teams of Japan